When All Else Fails is the fifth album by Californian punk rock band Bracket, released on May 9, 2000 through Fat Wreck Chords.  The album would be the first to feature guitarist Angelo Celli, who replaced founding member Larry Tinney the previous year.

Track listing
All songs written and composed by Bracket, except where noted.
"Everyone Is Telling Me I'll Never Win, If I Fall in Love with a Girl from Marin" – 2:37     
"Parade" – 2:20
"No Brainer" (Fat Mike, Bracket) – 2:11     
"Spazz" – 3:11     
"Cynically Depressed" – 3:23     
"Warren's Song, Pt. 9" – 2:55      
"Me vs. The World" – 3:19    
"You/Me" – 2:27  
"S.O.B. Story" – 3:19      
"A Happy Song" – 3:57      
"Suicide Note" – 3:08      
"Yoko Oh-No" – 3:44      
"A Place in Time" – 1:58
"Hearing Aid" (bonus track) - 3:03

Personnel
 Marty Gregori – vocals, guitar 
 Angelo Celli – guitar, vocals
 Zack Charlos – bass, vocals 
 Ray Castro – drums
 Fat Mike – guitar on "No Brainer"
 Ryan Greene – producer, engineer, mixer
 Bracket – producer
 Adam Krammer – engineer, mixer
 Ramón Brentón – mastering (Ocean View Digital Mastering)
 Rick Hines – photography
 Brian Archer – photography
 Tobias Jeg – photography

External links
 Fat Wreck Chords album page

2000 albums
Bracket (band) albums
Fat Wreck Chords albums
Albums produced by Ryan Greene